Daniil Medvedev defeated David Goffin in the final, 7–6(7–3), 6–4 to win the men's singles tennis title at the 2019 Cincinnati Masters. It was his first ATP Tour Masters 1000 title.

Novak Djokovic was the defending champion, but lost in the semifinals to Medvedev.

Nick Kyrgios set a record for the highest fine in ATP Tour history in his second round loss to Karen Khachanov. He was penalized $113,000 for five separate unsportsmanlike conduct violations including an expletive-laden rant, walking off-court to smash two racquets, and spitting at umpire Fergus Murphy.

Seeds
The top eight seeds receive a bye into the second round.

Draw

Finals

Top half

Section 1

Section 2

Bottom half

Section 3

Section 4

Qualifying

Seeds

Qualifiers

Lucky losers

Qualifying draw

First qualifier

Second qualifier

Third qualifier

Fourth qualifier

Fifth qualifier

Sixth qualifier

Seventh qualifier

References

External links
Main draw
Qualifying draw

Men's Singles